The Béjaïa Province (Kabyle: Tawilayt n Bgayet; , ;  or ) is a province of Algeria in the Kabylie region. The province's capital city is Béjaïa, the terminus of the Béni Mansour-Bejaïa line.

Gouraya National Park is located in Béjaïa Province. A population of an endangered primate species, the Barbary macaque, is found within the park; this primate has a severely restricted and disjunctive range.

History
The province was created from the Sétif (département) in 1974.

Administrative divisions
The province is divided into 19 districts (daïras), which are further divided into 52 communes or municipalities.

Districts

Communes

 Adekar
 Aït-Rizine
 Aït-Smail
 Akbou
 Akfadou
 Amalou
 Amizour
 Aokas
 Barbacha
 Béjaïa
 Beni Djellil
 Beni Ksila
 Beni Maouche
 Beni Mellikeche
 Boudjellil
 Bouhamza
 Boukhelifa
 Chelata
 Chemini
 Darguina
 Draâ El-Kaïd
 El-Flaye
 El-Kseur
 Feraoun
 Ifenain Ilmathen
 Ighil Ali
 Ighram
 Kendira
 Kherrata
 Melbou
 Msisna
 Oued Ghir
 Ouzellaguen
 Seddouk
 Semaoune
 Sidi-Aïch
 Sidi-Ayad
 Sidi-Saïd
 Souk El-Thenine
 Souk-Oufella
 Tala Hamza
 Tamokra
 Tamridjet
 Taourit Ighil
 Taskriout
 Tazmalt
 Tinabdher
 Tibane
 Tichy
 Tifra
 Timezrit
 Tizi N'Berber
 Toudja

References

External links
 The first website of Bgayet Béjaïa Bougie and his region
 Official website of Béjaïa Province

Kabylie
 
Provinces of Algeria
States and territories established in 1974